Decheng is a district and the seat of the city of Dezhou, in the northwest of Shandong province, China, bordering Hebei province to the north.

Administrative divisions
As 2012, this District is divided to 7 subdistricts, 3 towns and 2 townships.
Subdistricts

Towns
Ertun
Huangheya
Zhaohu

Townships
Taitousi Township
Yuanqiao Township

References

External links
  Official homepage

Decheng
Dezhou